Gheorghe is a Romanian given name and surname. It is a variant of George, also a name in Romanian but with soft Gs. It may refer to:

Given name 
 Gheorghe Adamescu
 Gheorghe Albu
 Gheorghe Alexandrescu
 Gheorghe Andriev
 Gheorghe Apostol
 Gheorghe Apostoleanu
 Gheorghe Argeşanu
 Gheorghe Arsenescu
 Gheorghe Asachi
 Gheorghe Băgulescu
 Gheorghe Balș
 Gheorghe Bănciulescu
 Gheorghe Banu
 Gheorghe Barbu
 Gheorghe Benga
 Gheorghe Bengescu
 Gheorghe Bibescu
 Gheorghe Bogdan-Duică
 Gheorghe Brăescu
 Gheorghe Brega
 Gheorghe Briceag
 Gheorghe Bucur
 Gheorghe Buruiană
 Gheorghe Buzatu
 Gheorghe Buzdugan
 Gheorghe Calciu-Dumitreasa
 Gheorghe Călugăreanu
 Gheorghe Caranda
 Gheorghe Cardaș
 Gheorghe Grigore Cantacuzino
 Gheorghe Cartianu-Popescu
 Gheorghe Catrina
 Gheorghe Cialâk
 Gheorghe Cipăianu
 Gheorghe E. Cojocaru
 Gheorghe Cosma
 Gheorghe Danielov
 Gheorghe Dănilă
 Gheorghe Derussi
 Gheorghe Dinică
 Gheorghe Duca
 Gheorghe Gheorghiu-Dej
 Gheorghe Ghibănescu
 Gheorghe Hagi
 Gheorghe A. Lăzăreanu-Lăzurică
 Gheorghe Macovei
 Gheorghe Manoliu
 Gheorghe Manu
 Gheorghe Mărdărescu
 Gheorghe Gaston Marin
 Gheorghe Gh. Mârzescu
 Gheorghe Mihail
 Gheorghe Mureșan
 Gheorghe Păun
 Gheorghe Pohrib
 Gheorghe Pintilie
 Gheorghe Pop de Băsești
 Gheorghe Popescu
 Gheorghe Răscănescu
 Gheorghe Tătărescu
 Gheorghe Vergil Şerbu
 Gheorghe Bunea Stancu
 Gheorghe Ursu
 Gheorghe Vitanidis
 Gheorghe Vodă
 Gheorghe Văleanu
 Gheorghe Vrănceanu
 Gheorghe Zamfir

Surname 

 Cornel Gheorghe
 Costin Gheorghe
 Elena Gheorghe
 Nicolae Gheorghe
 Tudor Gheorghe
 Vasile Gheorghe

Romanian masculine given names
Romanian-language surnames